Wilber Morris (November 27, 1937 - August 8, 2002) was an American jazz double bass player and bandleader.  He was the brother of the cornetist, composer, and conductor Butch Morris.

Wilber Morris recorded widely, and performed with such musicians as Pharoah Sanders, Steve Habib, Sonny Simmons, Alan Silva, Joe McPhee, Horace Tapscott, Butch Morris, Arthur Blythe, Charles Gayle, William Parker, and Billy Bang, Charles Tyler, Dennis Charles, Roy Campbell, Avram Fefer, Alfred 23 Harth, Borah Bergman and Rashied Ali.

Discography

As leader
1981: 		Collective Improvisations 	 	(Bleu Regard)
1983: 		Wilber Force	 	(DIW Records)
1995:                Breathing Together   (Freedom Jazz)
2001: 	 	Drum String Thing  (CIMP)

As sideman
With Marshall Allen
 PoZest (CIMP, 2000)

With Billy Bang
Rainbow Gladiator (Soul Note, 1981)
With Thomas Borgmann
BMN Trio - Nasty & Sweet (Nobusiness, 2013)
BMC Trio Organic (Lotus Sound, 1998)
Stalker Songs (CIMP, 1997)
The Last Concert: Dankeschön (Silkheart, 1998)
Boom Swing - BMC Trio (Konnex, 1998)
BMN Trio - You See What We're Sayin'  (CIMP, 1998)
With Rob Brown
Visage (Marge, 2000)
With Avram Fefer and Bobby Few
Few and Far Between (Boxholder, 2001)
With Avram Fefer and Steve Swell
Lucille's Gemini Dream (CIMP, 2002)
With Charles Gayle
Daily Bread (Black Saint, 1995)
With Steve Habib
 Live At Joe Joe's
With Frank Lowe
Exotic Heartbreak (Soul Note, 1981)
With David Murray
Body and Soul
Remembrances
Picasso
New Life
Lucky Four
Murray's Steps
Ballads for Bass Clarinet
With Kevin Norton
Not Only In That Golden Tree (Clean Feed, 2003)
With Positive Knowledge
Live in New York (Edgetone, 2003)
With Alan Silva
Alan Silva & the Sound Visions Orchestra (Eremite, 2001)
H.Con.Res.57/Treasure Box (Eremite, 2003)
With Steve Swell
This Now! (Cadence Jazz, 2003)

References

External links
Wilber Morris obituary
Wilber Morris page

1937 births
2002 deaths
American jazz double-bassists
Male double-bassists
Child jazz musicians
DIW Records artists
CIMP artists
20th-century American musicians
20th-century double-bassists
20th-century American male musicians
American male jazz musicians
Musicians from Los Angeles
Deaths from cancer in New Jersey